Sicap-Liberté is a commune d'arrondissement of the city of Dakar, Senegal. As of 2013 it had a population of 47,164.

References
Santi Sene Hagne is the mayor of the commune since 2010

Arrondissements of Dakar